Munster versus Ulster is a rivalry that dates back to the foundation of the game in Ireland in 1879. Games between the two have occurred on an annual basis since the inception of the IRFU Interprovincial Championship in 1946. Since the beginning of the inter-provincials in 1946, Ulster hold a 54–40 advantage in overall wins, with ten draws. Additionally, since the inception of the Celtic League in 2001–02, Munster hold a slender 21–20 advantage in wins, with two draws in that time.

In addition to meeting each other regularly in domestic competition, they sometimes also face off in high-profile European competition. For example, in the 2012 Heineken Cup quarter-finals, Ulster beat Munster 22–16 to advance to the competition semi-finals.

Summary of games since 1946

Statistics

Biggest wins

Munster: 64–7 (2018–19)

Ulster: 37–11 (2008–09)

Highest scoring match

Munster 64–7 Ulster (71 points, 2018–19)

Lowest scoring match

Munster 0–0 Ulster (0 points, 1952–53, 1963–64)

Most consecutive wins

Munster: 6 (1998–99 – 2001–02)

Ulster: 6 (1981–82 – 1986–87) 6 (1988–89 – 1993–94)

Results
A history of Munster–Ulster results since the formation of the inter-provincial championship in 1946:

References

See also
IRFU Interprovincial Championship
History of rugby union matches between Leinster and Munster
History of rugby union matches between Leinster and Ulster
History of rugby union matches between Munster and Connacht

Munster
Ulster
Rugby union rivalries in Ireland
United Rugby Championship